In statistics, the Neyman–Pearson lemma was introduced by Jerzy Neyman and Egon Pearson in a paper in 1933. The Neyman-Pearson lemma is part of the Neyman-Pearson theory of statistical testing, which introduced concepts like errors of the second kind, power function, and inductive behavior. The previous Fisherian theory of significance testing postulated only one hypothesis. By introducing a competing hypothesis, the Neyman-Pearsonian flavor of statistical testing allows investigating the two types of errors. The trivial cases where one always rejects or accepts the null hypothesis are of little interest but it does prove that one must not relinquish control over one type of error while calibrating the other. Their seminal paper of 1933, including the Neyman-Pearson lemma, comes at the end of this endeavor, not only showing the existence of tests with the most power that retain a prespecified level of type I error, but also providing a way to construct such tests. The Karlin-Rubin theorem extends the Neyman-Pearson lemma to settings involving composite hypotheses with monotone likelihood ratios.

Statement

For any hypothesis test with rejection set , and any , we say that it satisfies condition  if
 
 That is, the test has size  (that is, the probability of falsely rejecting the null hypothesis is ).
  such thatwhere  is a set ignorable in both  and  cases: .
 That is, we have a strict likelihood ratio test, except on an ignorable subset.
For any , let the set of level  tests be the set of all hypothesis tests with size at most . That is, letting its rejection set be , we have .

In practice, the likelihood ratio is often used directly to construct tests — see likelihood-ratio test. However it can also be used to suggest particular test-statistics that might be of interest or to suggest simplified tests — for this, one considers algebraic manipulation of the ratio to see if there are key statistics in it related to the size of the ratio (i.e. whether a large statistic corresponds to a small ratio or to a large one).

Example 

Let  be a random sample from the  distribution where the mean  is known, and suppose that we wish to test for  against . The likelihood for this set of normally distributed data is

We can compute the likelihood ratio to find the key statistic in this test and its effect on the test's outcome:

This ratio only depends on the data through . So we should reject  if  is sufficiently large. The rejection threshold depends on the size  of the test. In this example, the test statistic can be shown to be a scaled Chi-square distributed random variable and an exact critical value can be obtained.

Application in economics 
A variant of the Neyman–Pearson lemma has found an application in the seemingly unrelated domain of the economics of land value. One of the fundamental problems in consumer theory is calculating the demand function of the consumer given the prices. In particular, given a heterogeneous land-estate, a price measure over the land, and a subjective utility measure over the land, the consumer's problem is to calculate the best land parcel that they can buy – i.e. the land parcel with the largest utility, whose price is at most their budget. It turns out that this problem is very similar to the problem of finding the most powerful statistical test, and so the Neyman–Pearson lemma can be used.

Uses in electrical engineering 
The Neyman–Pearson lemma is quite useful in electronics engineering, namely in the design and use of radar systems, digital communication systems, and in signal processing systems. 
In radar systems, the Neyman–Pearson lemma is used in first setting the rate of missed detections to a desired (low) level, and then minimizing the rate of false alarms, or vice versa.
Neither false alarms nor missed detections can be set at arbitrarily low rates, including zero. All of the above goes also for many systems in signal processing.

Uses in particle physics 
The Neyman–Pearson lemma is applied to the construction of analysis-specific likelihood-ratios, used to e.g. test for signatures of new physics against the nominal Standard Model prediction in proton-proton collision datasets collected at the LHC.

See also 
 Error exponents in hypothesis testing
 F-test
 Lemma
 Wilks' theorem

References 

 E. L. Lehmann, Joseph P. Romano, Testing statistical hypotheses, Springer, 2008, p. 60

External links 
 Cosma Shalizi gives an intuitive derivation of the Neyman–Pearson Lemma using ideas from economics
 cnx.org: Neyman–Pearson criterion

Theorems in statistics
Statistical tests
Articles containing proofs
Lemmas